David Parker (born 27 April 1984) was an English football manager. He was the manager of Birmingham City Ladies in the FA Women's Super League from 2011 to 2017. Aged 26 he became the youngest manager in English football and one of the youngest ever to hold the FA – UEFA A Licence.

Coaching career

Early years
By the age of 21 Parker had completed his UEFA B Licence and published two articles on the football industry; his first explored the motivational techniques of Brian Clough, (2005), "A Report on the Motivational Theories of Brian Clough (1935–2004)", and the second a report investigating football finances, (2005), "Human Resource Accounting in Football Clubs: Comparative Study of Accounting Practices". These articles were completed during his time at university where he completed his degree at Birmingham University, achieving a First Class Double Honours Degree in Business and Finance. After returning from a spell coaching in the MLS, he took up a position with Amisco (Prozone) as the Head Performance Analyst. Through this role he worked in association with some of the biggest clubs in the Premier League.

Birmingham City Ladies
At the start of the 2011 FA WSL season, Parker was appointed as the Manager after a successful 2010–11 season with the Reserve team, where he led them to the FA Premier League Reserves League Title in his first season in charge.

In 2011 Birmingham City Ladies came close to winning the FAWSL at the first attempt, leading for most of the campaign before being overhauled by Arsenal on the penultimate day of the season. They also reached the Continental Cup Final but once again found Arsenal in the way at Burton Albion F.C. The season was notable for the goalscoring exploits of Rachel Williams who finished as leading scorer as well as winning the FA Players' Player of the Year Award. Due to the 2nd-place finish in the 2011 FA WSL Birmingham City Ladies qualified for a place in the 2012–13 UEFA Women's Champions League round of 32 for the first time in their history.

In May 2012 the Birmingham City Ladies won their first FA Women's Cup, beating Chelsea on penalties in the final at Ashton Gate in Bristol. Also in 2012, for the second consecutive year, the club finished 2nd in the FA WSL and were runners-up in the Continental Cup Final, both to Arsenal. The 2nd-place finish in the league qualified Birmingham for the 2013–14 UEFA Women's Champions League round of 32 for the 2nd season running.

During the 2013 campaign saw a transitional year where many star names left the football club due to Birmingham's inability to compete financially with the big clubs. However, by successfully transitioning the team with the introduction of the youngsters, the average age of the team dropped from 27 to 21 and a foundation was built that still maintained them as one of the most competitive teams in the league. Still competing the UEFA Champions League in 2013/14 season Birmingham qualified for the Quarter Finals for the first time in their history.

In the spring of 2014 Birmingham beat Arsenal 3–0 on aggregate to progress to the Semi Finals of the Champions League and faced Swedish side Tyreso which contained many of the women's games star players, such as Marta. It was a unique achievement for a semi professional side completing with full-time clubs, with far superior budgets in the biggest club competition. Birmingham came within 20 minutes of continuing the remarkable run by almost reaching the final, before falling short in the final stages of the game.

Birmingham continued this extraordinary run in the FAWSL by again almost winning the league for the third time in four seasons. In a remarkable end to the season Birmingham missed out on the title by 1 goal in an agonising game v Notts County. Birmingham continued to demonstrate that despite the small financial resources available to them they are still able to compete with the top clubs in England.

The 2015 FAWSL season saw a drop of from the previous 4 seasons success, but the team galvanised together to eventually finish 6th and survive their relegation dog fight. This was all turned around in the 2016 season for David Parker and his young Birmingham Team. Having changed many aspects of the club including many backroom team staff and players a fresh young team was able to take centre stage and once again under his leadership drove the club the silence the critics again and push for a top 3 finish including another Continental Cup final vs. Man City.

Honours and achievements

Managerial

Birmingham City Ladies (2011–2017)
FA Women's Super League - Manager of the Year: 2014
UEFA Women's Champions League – Semi Finalists: 2014
Women's FA Cup – Winner (1): 2012
FA Women's Super League – Runners Up (2): 2011, 2012
FA Women's Super League – Top 4 Finish (5): 2011, 2012, 2013, 2014, 2016
FA WSL Continental Cup – Runners Up (3): 2011, 2012, 2016

Birmingham City Ladies Reserves / Development Squad (2010–2016)
FA Women's Premier League – Reserve League (1): 2010–11
FA Women's Super League Development Cup (1): 2014-15

Managerial statistics

Individual records
 FA WSL 1 Manager of the Year - 2014
 Longest Serving FA WSL 1 Manager 
 Record Points Amassed by a Head Coach in FA WSL 1
 Led Birmingham City Ladies to the Highest Ranked British Team in Europe (2014, 2015, 2016)

References

1984 births
Living people
English football managers
Sportspeople from Sutton Coldfield
Women's Super League managers